The Argentine Film Critics Association is an organization of Argentine-based journalists and correspondents. The association presents the Silver Condor Awards (Premios Cóndor de Plata) honoring achievements in Argentine cinema. The awards are considered Argentina's equivalent of the Academy Awards.

The association was organized on July 10, 1942, and the annual awards have been given since 1943, with breaks in between. The Argentine Film Critics Association is a member of the International Federation of Film Critics, also known as FIPRESCI.

Silver Condor 
The Silver Condor (Cóndor de Plata) is awarded in various categories, the best Ibero-American film, and the best foreign film. A Special Condor is sometimes presented, and the Career Condor is awarded on a regular basis. According to the Internet Movie Database the association has given awards in the following years: 1943–1957, 1959–1974, 1981–1983, 1985–present.

As of March 2019 the Secretary General of the association is Juan Pablo Russo.

Awards

Current Award Categories 
This is a list of the 24 prize categories presented at the last award ceremony on the 13th of August 2018:

 Best Film
 Best Documentary
 Best First Film
 Best Ibero-American Film
 Best Foreign Film
 Best Director
 Best Actor
 Best Actress
 Best Supporting Actor
 Best Supporting Actress
 Best Newcomer (Male)
 Best Newcomer (Female)
 Best Original Screenplay
 Best Adapted Screenplay
 Best Cinematography
 Best Editing
 Best Music
 Best Sound
 Best Production Design
 Best Costume Design
 Makeup & Hairdressing
 Best Short Film
 Best Film on Video
 Career Award (includes journalists)

Former Award Categories 
Prize categories that have been awarded in the past, but are currently not given, include:
 Best Animated Feature (2001 – 2008)
 Best Camera Operator

References

External links 
 Argentine Film Critics Association Official Site 
 Argentine Film Critics Association Awards by year at IMDb

 
Argentine culture
Latin American culture
Film critics associations
Arts organizations established in 1942
Argentine film awards
Argentine film critics
1942 establishments in Argentina
Film organisations in Argentina
Non-profit organisations based in Argentina